Meiacanthus vittatus, the one-striped fangblenny, is a species of combtooth blenny found in coral reefs in the western Pacific ocean.  This species grows to a length of  TL.  This species can be found in the aquarium trade.

References

vittatus
Fish described in 1976